Jakes may refer to:

 Jakes (surname)
 Jakes (toilet), a type of toilet in a small structure separate from the main building which does not have a flush or sewer attached
 Jakes Mulholland (20th century), American soccer player
 The Police
 Engine compression brake systems on trucks, buses, and lorries ("semi trucks"). They are often called "Jake Brakes" or "Jakes" after Jacobs Manufacturing, the first company to produce them.

See also
 Jake (disambiguation)